Nebria castanea is a species of ground beetle from Nebriinae family that can be found in Austria, France, Germany, Italy, and  Switzerland.

References

castanea
Beetles described in 1810
Beetles of Europe